Nicholas John Cusack (born 24 December 1965 in Maltby, West Riding of Yorkshire) is an English former footballer and, briefly, player-manager. He was for a time chairman of the Professional Footballers' Association (PFA), and is now an Assistant Chief Executive.

Football career
In October 1997 Cusack joined Swansea City from Fulham for a fee of £50,000.

After a period as caretaker manager, he was appointed player-coach in April 2002, but after just 17 games in charge he was replaced by Brian Flynn; he turned down an offer to remain on the coaching staff, and left in September 2002 with the club at the bottom of the Football League.

Cusack was Swansea's PFA representative, and was elected chairman of the Association, succeeding Barry Horne, in November 2001. He was active in the PFA's opposition to a reduction of professional clubs in the league pyramid.

In 2016, Cusack was elected to the General Council of the Trades Union Congress.

Managerial stats

Honours
Individual
PFA Team of the Year: 1999–2000 Third Division

References

1965 births
Living people
People from Maltby, South Yorkshire
English footballers
Association football midfielders
Leicester City F.C. players
Peterborough United F.C. players
Motherwell F.C. players
Darlington F.C. players
Oxford United F.C. players
Wycombe Wanderers F.C. players
Fulham F.C. players
Swansea City A.F.C. players
English football managers
Swansea City A.F.C. managers
English Football League players
Scottish Football League players
Alvechurch F.C. players
Sportspeople from Yorkshire
Members of the General Council of the Trades Union Congress